Sankt Georgen im Lavanttal is a town in the district of Wolfsberg in the Austrian state of Carinthia.

Geography
The municipality lies in the lower Lavant River valley 17 km south of Wolfsberg.

References

Cities and towns in Wolfsberg District